The Moore's Corner Historic District of Leverett, Massachusetts, encompasses the historic rural mill village of Moore's Corner. Centered on the intersection of North Leverett Road with Dudleyville Road, Church Hill Road, and Rattlesnake Gutter Road, it includes 15 houses and several other buildings, mainly from the village's mid-19th century peak as a modest rural village center.    The district was listed on the National Register of Historic Places in 2014.

Description and history
Moore's Corner is located in northeastern Leverett, a rural community in eastern Franklin County.  The village is centered at North Leverett and Dudleyville Roads, but has widely spaced buildings beyond a small central core, extending along those two roads as well as Rattlesnake Gutter Road and Church Hill Road. It includes predominantly residential buildings that were built during the height of the area's industrial activity between the 1840s and 1860s. The architecture is mainly Federal and Greek Revival in style, although the Moore's Corner Church, built in 1896, is Queen Anne in style. One of the most distinctive houses is that of Jonah Hunt at 8 Dudleyville Road, which is Leverett's only temple-front Greek Revival house.  The district also includes historical archaeological remnants, including a former mill site on the Sawmill River, and a house foundation.

Leverett was part of a large area that was originally part of Sunderland, settled in the 17th century. Sunderland's border was extended eastward in 1729, and then its eastern section was separated as Leverett in 1774. Moore's Corner was settled in the 1790s by Asa Moore, a veteran of the American Revolutionary War, who established a sawmill in this area soon afterward. Moore's c. 1790 house, located at 197 North Leverett Road, is the oldest house in the district. A mill erected by Asa's brother Alven in 1793 survives on Dudleytown Road. In 1810, the growing village built a brick schoolhouse (230 North Leverett Road), which also served as a meeting house for the local Universalist congregation. The village cemetery, on Rattlesnake Gutter Road, was established about the same time, on land given by Asa Moore. More woodworking mills were built in the mid-19th century, including one that manufactured wooden shingles; the buildings have not survived, but its foundations remain on the banks of the Sawmill River.

See also
Leverett Center Historic District
East Leverett Historic District
National Register of Historic Places listings in Franklin County, Massachusetts

References

Buildings and structures in Franklin County, Massachusetts
National Register of Historic Places in Franklin County, Massachusetts
Historic districts on the National Register of Historic Places in Massachusetts
Leverett, Massachusetts